Hjalmar Nygaard (12 June 1900 – died 29 October 1936 in Boston) was a Norwegian boxer who competed in the 1920 Summer Olympics. In 1920 he was eliminated in the first round of the bantamweight class after losing his fight to Henri Ricard. Nygaard moved to Boston in 1923, and worked as a bookbinder. He died after falling while painting a house.

References

External links
 list of Norwegian boxers 

1900 births
1936 deaths
Bantamweight boxers
Olympic boxers of Norway
Boxers at the 1920 Summer Olympics
Norwegian male boxers
20th-century Norwegian people